The Fudan University Shanghai Cancer Center (FUSCC), also called the Shanghai Cancer Hospital, is a teaching hospital affiliated with the Shanghai Medical College of Fudan University.  Founded in 1931, it is the first cancer specialty hospital in China. It is rated Grade 3, Class A.

Overview
In 2013, the hospital had 1,489 staff, including 1,298 medical professionals, 154 of whom are professors or associate professors. The president is Jiang Guoliang (蒋国梁), a fellow of the American College of Radiology. The hospital has 1,100 beds and treats more than 590,000 outpatients and 22,000 inpatients per year.

The hospital publishes two Chinese-language journals, the English Journal of Radioation Oncology, and the magazine Anti-Cancer (抗癌).

History
The hospital was founded on 1 March 1931 as the Sino-Belgian Radium Institute (French: Institut Sino-Belge du Radium), sited in the Sacred Heart Hospital of Shanghai (now Yangpu Central Hospital). It was funded by a minor remittance of Boxer Indemnity paid by China to Belgian. It became an independent institute in 1936, and was renamed Shanghai Radium Institute after the Communists captured Shanghai in 1949. It was affiliated to the Shanghai First Medical College from 1954, and renamed the Cancer Hospital of SFMC.

See also
Tang Yuhan, former president of the Sino-Belgian Radium Institute

References 

Teaching hospitals in Shanghai
Fudan University
Hospitals established in 1931
1931 establishments in China
Cancer hospitals in China